Harvey G. Stenger is an American educator and academic administrator, who is serving as the seventh president of Binghamton University since 2012.

Background and education
Harvey G. Stenger is a native of upstate New York. He received his B.S. from Cornell University in chemical engineering in 1979 and his Ph.D. from Massachusetts Institute of Technology in 1983. While at Cornell, he joined Alpha Sigma Phi fraternity.

Employment history
 Lehigh University
1984–1988 Assistant professor of chemical engineering
1988–1991 Associate professor of chemical engineering
1991–2006 Professor of chemical engineering
1989–1991 Co-chairman, Dept. of Chemical Engineering
1991–1993 Director, Environmental Studies Center
1993–1999 College of Engineering and Applied Science

 University at Buffalo
2006–2011 Professor of Chemical and Biological Engineering; Dean, School of Engineering and Applied Sciences
2011 Interim Provost 

 Binghamton University
2012–  President

References

External links
 

Cornell University alumni
Massachusetts Institute of Technology alumni
Lehigh University faculty
Presidents of Binghamton University
University at Buffalo faculty
Binghamton University faculty

Living people
Year of birth missing (living people)